Stuart Randall (born Clarence Maxwell, July 24, 1909 – June 22, 1988) was an American actor of film and television who appeared on screen between 1950 and 1971.

Early years
Randall was born in Santa Barbara, California, or Brazil, Indiana, the son of Walter Maxwell and Allie Ball Maxwell. He attended Brazil High School. Growing up, he lived in Santa Barbara, Denver, and Brazil. Before he became an actor, he sang with bands, including those of Jan Garber and Abe Lyman; led an orchestra; and was a radio technician. In World War II, he was an observer for the general staff of the U. S. Army's ground forces. In that role he completed 18 missions behind enemy liens in the European theater.

Career 
Randall portrayed sheriff Art Sampson on the television Western Cimarron City.

Personal life
 
Randall was married to Mary Adams on November 20, 1942 until February 15, 1950, at which time they divorced.  They had two children.  Later he married Rose Leone, date unknown, whom he remained with until his death.

Death
Randall died in 1988, aged 78, at his home in Victorville, San Bernardino County, California, from undisclosed causes.

Filmography

References

External links 

Stuart Randall Fan Page on Facebook - https://www.facebook.com/groups/1784329561844865
 
 

1909 births
1988 deaths
People from Brazil, Indiana
Male actors from Indiana
American male film actors
American male television actors
20th-century American male actors